The Santuario di Vicoforte (also known as Santuario Regina Montis Regalis) is a monumental church located in the commune of Vicoforte, province of Cuneo, Piedmont, northern Italy. It is known for having the largest elliptical cupola in the world.

History 
It originated as a small medieval sanctuary, consisting of a modest shrine containing a fifteenth-century fresco depicting a Madonna and Child. Around 1590 a shooting party passed by and a huntsman accidentally struck the image of the Virgin. According to legend, she began to bleed. The penitent huntsman added his arquebus to the shrine and began to collect the large sum of money which would be needed to repair the damage and expiate his sin. Today the arquebus is preserved in a chapel of the sanctuary near the fresco which it had disfigured.

In time the place became a centre of pilgrimage. An early visitor was the duke Charles Emmanuel I of Savoy who, in 1596, commissioned the construction of a large sanctuary from the court architect Ascanio Vitozzi. However the death of both the duke (who had wanted to be buried here), and of the architect, put a stop to the building work.

Construction was resumed in the eighteenth century under Francesco Gallo who built the great elliptical cupola which has major and minor diameters of  respectively. It is said that Gallo was required to remove the scaffolding himself, as nobody thought that a structure of this type would be able to stand on its own.

On December 15, 2017, after years of planning, the remains of Queen Elena of Italy, were secretly transferred from Montpellier, France, to the chapel of San Bernardo inside the sanctuary. Two days later, the remains of King Vittorio Emanuele III of Italy were transferred from St. Catherine's Cathedral, Alexandria, Egypt, where he had died in exile, and interred alongside the former queen.

See also
 History of early modern period domes

References

External links 
 Santuario Di Vicoforte (official website)

Roman Catholic churches completed in 1884
19th-century Roman Catholic church buildings in Italy
Basilica churches in Piedmont
Churches in the province of Cuneo
Baroque architecture in Piedmont
Church buildings with domes
Vicoforte